Yasmine Mathurin is a Haitian Canadian filmmaker, most noted for her 2021 film One of Ours. The film was a Canadian Screen Award nominee for Best Feature Length Documentary, and Mathurin was nominated for Best Direction in a Documentary Program and Best Writing in a Documentary Program, at the 10th Canadian Screen Awards in 2022.

Mathurin divided her time between Haiti and Montreal in childhood, before moving to Calgary as a teenager. After studying political science at York University in Toronto, she attained a fellowship at the United Nations in 2011, but became disenchanted with the bureaucratic aspects of politics and went back to school to study journalism. She subsequently created The Conversation Project, a web series in which she engaged her friends in conversation about Black Canadian culture and identity, and participated in a talent incubator run by Toronto film studio Refuge Productions to further develop her filmmaking skills. She was a producer of Tai Asks Why, a Canadian Broadcasting Corporation podcast and summer radio series.

References

External links

Canadian documentary film directors
Canadian women film directors
Black Canadian filmmakers
Black Canadian women
Haitian emigrants to Canada
York University alumni
Living people
Year of birth missing (living people)
Canadian women documentary filmmakers